This is a list of people named after Abraham, the Biblical patriarch ( Ashkenazi Avrohom or Avruhom); the father of the Abrahamic religions: Judaism, Christianity and Islam.

As recounted in the Torah, his name was originally Avram which means "High Father" - "av" (אב) "father", "ram" (רם) "high" - with the "ha" (ה) added in mark of his covenant with God.

Given name
Abraham of Kashkar, Mar Abraham I, bishop of the Church of the East (148–171 AD)
Abraham (Egyptian saint), martyred in Egypt with John of Samanoud and James of Manug
Saint Abraham (Ethiopian), a saint of the Ethiopian Orthodox Tewahedo Church, part of the martyrs Abraham, Ethnus, Acrates, James, and John venerated in Ethiopia as saints
Abraham (Persian saint), 4th century Christian saint, martyred with Sapor of Bet-Nicator
Abraham of Arbela (died c. 348), Syrian bishop, martyr, and saint
Abraham of Arazd, 5th century Armenian Christian priest, hermit, and saint 5th century Armenian Christian priest, hermit, and saint
Abraham of Bet-Parsaje, 4th century Persian Christian saint, martyred with Mana of Bet-Parsaje
Abraham of Clermont (died c.485), Syrian-French abbot, founder of the abbey of St. Cirgues in Clermont
Abraham of Cyrrhus (died 442), Syrian-born, Anatolian Roman Catholic saint
Abraham of Egypt, a monk and saint of the Coptic Church
Abraham of Farshut or Abraham (Copt) (lived 5th or 6th century), a saint of the Coptic Church
Abraham of the High Mountain (died 446), 5th century Christian saint
Abraham of Kiev, a monk and Ukrainian Roman Catholic saint
Abraham of Kratia (c.474–c.558), a Christian monk and saint
Mar Abraham, a saint of the Syriac Orthodox Church
Abraham of Nethpra, a 6th century saint of the Assyrian Church of the East
Abraham of Scetes, a monk and saint of the Coptic Church
Abraham the Great of Kaskhar, (492–586), saint and monastic reformer of the Assyrian Church of the East
Abraham the Great of Kidunja (died c.366), a Christian hermit, priest and saint
Abraham the Writer, a saint of the Syrian Orthodox Church
 Abraha, a variant form, King of Saba'

9th to 13th century
Pope Abraham of Alexandria (died 978), Syrian Coptic Pope
Abraham II (Nestorian patriarch), Patriarch of the Church of the East from 837 to 850
Abraham III (Nestorian patriarch), Abraham III Abraza,  Patriarch of the Church of the East from 906 to 937
Abraham of Bulgaria (died 1229), a Russian convert from Islam to Eastern Orthodoxy, martyr, Christian saint
Abraham of Miroshsk (died 1158), abbot of the Holy Redeemer monastery in Pskow
Abraham of Strathearn (died 1220s), Catholic bishop of Dunblane
Abraham of Smolensk (died 1221), Russian Eastern Orthodox monk and saint
Abraham bar Hiyya (1070–1145), Jewish mathematician, astronomer and philosopher
Abraham ben David (~1125–1198),  Provençal rabbi, author and critic
Abraham ibn Daud (~1110–~1180), Spanish-Jewish astronomer, historian, and philosopher
Abraham ibn Ezra (1089–1164), Spanish-Jewish philosopher, astronomer/astrologer, mathematician, poet, and linguistics scholar

14th to 15th century
Abraham and Coprius of Griasowetzk (for Abraham of Griasowetzk), 15th century abbot and saint
Abraham of Galich (died 1375), saint and founder of four Russian monasteries
Abraham the Laborious, a 14th century monk and saint of Ukraine
Abraham Paleostrowski (died c. 1460), an abbot and saint of the Russian Orthodox Church
Ignatius Abraham bar Gharib, Syriac Orthodox patriarch of Mardin

16th to 18th century
Abraham II of Armenia or Abraham Khoshabetzi, Catholicos of the Armenian Apostolic Church between 1730 and 1734
Abraham III of Armenia or Abraham of Crete or Abraham Kretatsi (d. 1737), Catholicos of the Armenian Apostolic Church between 1734 and 1737
Abraham of Angamaly (died c. 1597) (Mar Abraham), Church of the East bishop
Abraham a Sancta Clara (1644–1709), Austrian Augustinian monk
Abraham Angermannus (died 1607), Swedish Lutheran archbishop
Abraham Abramson (c.1753–1811), Prussian coiner
Abram Petrovich Gannibal (1696–1781), African slave
Abraham Khalfon (1741–1819), Tripoli Jewish community leader, historian, and paytan
Abraham Robertson (1751–1826), English mathematician
Abraham von Franckenberg (1593–1652), German mystic, author, poet and hymn-writer

Contemporary (19th century onward)
Abraham Abraham (1843–1911), American department store magnate
Abraham Almonte (born 1989), Dominican baseball player
Abraham Bankier (1910–1956), Polish Jewish businessman who helped with Oskar Schindler's wartime rescue activities
Avraham Even-Shoshan (1906–1984), Israeli Hebrew linguist and lexicographer
Abraham Beame (1906–2001), first Jewish mayor of New York City
Abraham Beem (1934–1944), Dutch Jewish child gassed to death in Auschwitz concentration camp
Abraham Blum (1905–1943), Polish-Jewish activist
Abraham H. Cannon (1859–1896), American Latter-day Saint apostle
Abram Cohen (1924–2016), American Olympic fencer
Abraham Cole (died 1890), American politician
Abraham Cykiert (1926–2009), Australian Holocaust survivor and Melburnian playwright and Zionist activist of the 1970s
Abraham González Casanova (born 1985), Catalan (Spanish) association football player
Abraham Goodman, known as Abby Mann (1927–2008), American film writer and producer
Abraham Greenberg (1881–1941), American lawyer and politician
Abraham Gutt (born 1944), Israeli basketball player
Abraham Hatfield (1867–1957), American businessman, philanthropist, and philatelist
Abraham Joshua Heschel (1907–1972), Polish-American rabbi, philosopher and Jewish theologian
Abraham Hochmuth (1816–1889), Hungarian rabbi
 Abraham Hoffman (1938-2015), Israeli basketball player
Avraham Kalmanowitz (1891–1964), European Rav, founder and rosh yeshiva of Mir yeshiva in Brooklyn
Abraham Kurland (1912–1999), Danish Olympic medalist in wrestling
Abraham Lansing (1835–1899), American lawyer and politician in New York
Abraham Lincoln (1809–1865), U.S. President
Abraham Lucas (born 1998), American football player
Abraham Lunggana (1959–2021), Indonesian politician
Abraham Maslow (1908–1970), American psychologist
Abraham Mateo, Spanish actor and pop singer
Abraham Nava (born 1964), Mexican association football player
Abraham Olano (born 1970), Spanish former professional cyclist
Abraham Razack (born 1945), a legislative councillor in Hong Kong
Abraham Robinson (1918–1974), Jewish mathematician, the founder of non-standard analysis
Abraham Roqueñi (born 1978), Spanish kickboxer
Abraham Barak Salem (1882–1967), Indian Jewish lawyer, independence activist, and Zionist
Abraham Samad (born 1966), Indonesian lawyer
Abraham Shakespeare (1966–2009), lottery winner and apparent murder victim
Avraham Shlonsky (1900–1973), Israeli poet and editor
Abraham Shneior (1928–1998), Israeli Olympic basketball player
Abraham "Bram" Stoker (1847–1912), Irish novelist best known for his novel Dracula
Abraham Tokazier (1909–1976), Finnish sprinter
Abraham Toro (born 1996), Canadian baseball player
Abraham Torres (born 1968), Venezuelan boxer
Abraham Van Vorhes (1793–1879), American politician
Abraham Wickelgren (born 1969), American lawyer
Abraham O. Woodruff (1872–1904), American Latter-day Saint apostle
Avrohom Yaakov Friedman (first Sadigura rebbe) (1820–1883)
Avrohom Yaakov Friedman (third Sadigura rebbe) (1884–1961) 
Avrohom Yaakov Friedman (fifth Sadigura rebbe) (1928–2013)

See also
Abiram

References

Notes

Sources
В. А. Никонов (V. A. Nikonov). "Ищем имя" (Looking for a Name). Изд. "Советская Россия". Москва, 1988. 
Н. А. Петровский (N. A. Petrovsky). "Словарь русских личных имён" (Dictionary of Russian First Names). ООО Издательство "АСТ". Москва, 2005. 
[1] А. В. Суперанская (A. V. Superanskaya). "Современный словарь личных имён: Сравнение. Происхождение. Написание" (Modern Dictionary of First Names: Comparison. Origins. Spelling). Айрис-пресс. Москва, 2005. 
[2] А. В. Суперанская (A. V. Superanskaya). "Словарь русских имён" (Dictionary of Russian Names). Издательство Эксмо. Москва, 2005. 

English-language masculine given names
English masculine given names
Danish masculine given names
Dutch masculine given names
French masculine given names
Finnish masculine given names
German masculine given names
Hebrew masculine given names
Icelandic masculine given names
Irish masculine given names
Norwegian masculine given names
Scottish masculine given names
Spanish masculine given names
Swedish masculine given names